The Hero Fracture Zone is an undersea fracture zone in the Antarctic. Its name was approved by the Advisory Committee on Undersea Features in June 1987.

See also
Hero (sloop)

References

Geology of the Southern Ocean
Fracture zones